Los Muertos de Cristo (LMDC, The Dead Of Christ) was a Spanish heavy metal band that appeared in Utrera, Andalusia, Spain, in 1989, with an anarchist ideology. LMDC announced its dissolution in 2006, although they released their last album (Rapsodia Libertaria Vol. III) on 9 November 2009, before their retirement after one last tour. Some of its members later formed the group El Noi del Sucre.

Members
 Lorenzo Morales "El Noi": Vocals.
 Antón Tochi: guitar.
 Jesus Mosteiro "Mosti": guitar and chorus
 Ignacio Gallego "Chino": bass and chorus.
 Manuel Borrego "Lolo": drums.

Discography
 Punk's not Dead´91 (1991). Demo.
 A Las Barricadas (1995)
 Cualquier Noche Puede Salir El Sol (1996)
 Los Olvidados (1997)
 Los Pobres No Tienen Patria (1999)
 Bienvenidos al Infierno (2001). Live double CD.
 Rapsodia Libertaria. Volumen I (2004).
 Rapsodia Libertaria. Volumen II (2007).
 Rapsodia Libertaria. Volumen III - Doble CD (2009). Live.

Films and books
 Trece años después, y esto no es un cuento de Hadas - Comic about the history of the group + La Gran Estafa Del Rock 'n' Roll (2003). Compilation of live shows and demos.
 Ladran, Luego Cabalgamos - Double DVD (2006).
 Los Muertos de cristo en imágenes - 132 minute documentary about the group.

References

Spanish punk rock groups